America's Intercultural Magazine (abbreviated AIM) was a magazine established in 1973 with the intent of working against racism, discrimination, and bigotry in the United States. Ruth Apilado founded AIM in 1973 after retiring from teaching. Published four times a year, it offered scholarships through literary competitions whose contents align with the ideals of AIM. It discontinued in 2007.

References

1973 establishments in Illinois
2007 disestablishments in Illinois
Defunct literary magazines published in the United States
English-language magazines
Magazines established in 1973
Magazines disestablished in 2007
Magazines published in Chicago
Quarterly magazines published in the United States